Marcos Celorrio Yécora (born 19 February 1997), is a Spanish footballer who plays as a forward.

Club career
Born in Logroño, Celorrio finished his graduation with Real Sociedad. In January 2020 he moved to Calahorra, on loan for the rest of the season.

On 18 June 2020 he signed a 1 year contract with Norwegian side Sandefjord.

In September 2021 Sandefjord agreed to terminate his contract after a wish from the player himself to go back to Spain.

Career statistics

Club

References

External links

1997 births
Living people
Spanish footballers
Footballers from Catalonia
Association football forwards
CD Calahorra players
Sandefjord Fotball players
Eliteserien players
Expatriate footballers in Norway
Spanish expatriate sportspeople in Norway